Sir Robert Newcomen, 6th Baronet (1664 – 6 March 1735) was an Anglo-Irish politician.

Newcomen succeeded to his father's baronetcy in 1689. He represented Longford County in the Irish House of Commons between 1692 and his death in 1735.

References

1664 births
1735 deaths
17th-century Anglo-Irish people
18th-century Anglo-Irish people
Baronets in the Baronetage of Ireland
Irish MPs 1692–1693
Irish MPs 1695–1699
Irish MPs 1703–1713
Irish MPs 1713–1714
Irish MPs 1715–1727
Irish MPs 1727–1760
Members of the Parliament of Ireland (pre-1801) for County Longford constituencies
Newcomen family